Nu ska vi sjunga was published in 1943 by the Almqvist & Wiksell publishing company, and is a songbook for Swedish primary schools. Songs marked with * are meant to be sung in the third grade. The book was published on the initiative of Alice Tegnér.

Songs

I Årstiderna (seasons) 
Årstiderna
Liten vårvisa
Alla fåglar kommit re'n
Göken ropar högt uti skogen
Månaderna
När kommer våren?
Nu är det vår
En vårvintersaga
Majas visa
Vårvisa
Lilla Ingas sommarvisa
Den första sommarvinden
Plocka svamp
Kantareller (Har du sett herr Kantarell?)
En vintervisa
Se opp!
Kälkbacksvisa
Sommar, vinter, vår och höst
I snöfall
Avsked till vintern

II Visor om djur och blommor (songs about animals and flowers) 
Bä, bä vita lamm
Djurvisa
Snick, Snack, Snäcka
Morgonvisa
Fågelungen
Vita svanar
Fjäril'n på ängen
Visan om humlorna
Imse vimse spindeln
Biet
Gräshoppan
Bonden och kråkan
Rim för smått folk
För de minsta
Katten och råttan
Katten och svansen
Barnvisa
Katten och sparven
Familjen Krokodil
Fyra små grisar
Kossorna på bete
Mickel du en gås har stulit
Fröken Kissekatt och herr Max von Tax
Vid Kattegatt
Positivspelaren
Mors lilla Olle
Ekorren
Vaggvisa
Blåsippor
Vårlöken
Rosendröm
Rosenknoppen
Videvisan
Skogsblommorna till barnen
Akta skogen
Lilla Tusselago
Linblommornas visa
Fjäril'n vingad syns på Haga
Bröllopsfesten

III Lekvisor (songs for games) 
Klockan tolv
Vart ska du gå?
Barnen leka "mamma och barn" (Goddag min fru)
Lille vedhuggaren
Majas vaggvisa för dockan
Baka kaka
Tre pepparkaksgubbar
Kära lilla Lisen
Hej hopp i gröna hagen!
Poliskonstapeln
Trafiklek
Flygvisa
Vill ni veta
Sotarvisa
Leka skola
Elev och lärarinna
Danslåt
Regndropparna
Arbetsbyte
Kungens lilla piga
Små grodorna
Trollmors vaggsång
Trollfar i Snurreberget
Tummeliten
Annikas visa

IV Vandringsvisor (hiking songs) 
I skogen
Vandringsvisa
Marschlek, (När jag sist gick ut att vandra)
Marsch
Rida vall
Vaktparaden
Hemåt i regnväder
Sommarvandring
Traskvisa
En vandringslåt
När jag gick ut på vandringsstråt
Vi gå över daggstänkta berg

V Julsånger (Christmas songs) 
Julafton
När juldagsmorgon glimmar
Nu lyser julens stjärna klar
Juleklockor
Liten julvisa (Raska fötter springa tripp tripp, tripp)
Julsång
Välkommen du härliga juletid
Nu är det jul
Julpolskan
Kring julgranen (Nu så är det jul igen)
Nu tändas tusen juleljus
Julsång
Tomtarnas julnatt
Julpolska
Luciasång

VI Kanon (canon) 
Kyrkklockorna
Skolklockan
Huru högt
Morgonsolen redan strålar
Glad och god
Gott humör
All vår början
Musiken
Glatt framåt marschera
Dansvisa
Upp kamrater
Vi gratulera
Posten kommer
Hatten

VII Andra vackra sånger och visor (other beautiful songs and ballads) 
Lasse liten
Mors namnsdag
Stinas pepparkakssoldat
Sockerbagaren
Nisse tänker sjöman bli
Den lille Nisse reste
En lite körsven
Karl skall jaga
När Olle fick heta Pilleman
Anders Lasse och hans gris
Sparman far till läger
Lille John Blund
Lyckans land (Vid en väg på en sten)
Kvällsvisa
Blinka lilla stjärna
Himlen är av stjärnor full
Solvisa
Solstrålen
Jesus och barnen
Psalm för barn
Gud, som haver barnen kär
Hosianna
Jag lyfter ögat mot himmelen
Du gamla, du fria
Kungssången
Jag är så glad att jag är svensk

References 

1943 books
1943 in education
1943 in music
Education in Sweden
Song books
Swedish music